Local elections in the United Kingdom took place on 5 May 2022. These included elections for all London borough councils, for all local authorities in Wales and Scotland. Most seats in England were last up for election in 2018 and in Scotland and Wales in 2017. The elections coincided with the 2022 Northern Ireland Assembly election. In 91 cases, most of them in Wales, council seats were uncontested, each having only one candidate. Three seats in Scotland remained unfilled as no one nominated to fill them.

Overall
Across Great Britain, the Conservatives had a net loss of 487 seats in comparison to 2017 in Scotland and Wales and 2018 in England, whilst Labour gained 108 seats (22 in England, 20 in Scotland, and 66 in Wales). The Liberal Democrats and Greens made gains of 224 seats and 87 seats, respectively, which exceeded those of the Labour Party in England but were also seen to a more modest extent in Scotland and Wales. The Scottish National Party (SNP) gained 22 seats in Scotland whilst Plaid Cymru made a net loss of 6 seats in Wales.

By party

Used to project a general election
The results may be further processed to project the result of a hypothetical concurrent general election.

England

By party

Councils

Background
In total, 4,411 council seats are being contested in England, including irregular by-elections.

Most seats in England up for election in 2022 were last elected in 2018. The exceptions are local authorities which have undergone recent boundary reviews. In the 2018 local elections, the Labour Party made gains in London at the expense of the Conservative Party, who in turn made gains in the rest of England at the expense of the UK Independence Party (UKIP). Few councils changed overall control. Overall, UKIP lost 237 of the 243 seats it had held before the elections. According to the BBC's analysis, the results reflected a national political situation with Labour and the Conservatives "neck-and-neck".

County councils
County councils are the upper tier of a two-tier system of local government, with the area each council covers subdivided into district councils with different responsibilities. These are first-past-the-post elections with a mixture of single-member and multi-member electoral divisions. County councils are elected in full every four years, with the last election having been in 2021. However, due to consultations about possible unitarisation, elections for three county councils were postponed to 2022. The government has announced plans to replace the councils with unitary authorities pending Parliamentary approval.

Elections to the new Somerset Council took place on 5 May 2022 for a unitary authority to run concurrently with the district councils until their abolition in April 2023. In a similar way, members of North Yorkshire Council were elected at the same time, with its councillors to serve as county councillors for one year and then to serve an additional four-year term as unitary councillors. Cumbria's two new unitary authorities were elected as "shadow authorities" which would go live after gaining their powers in 2023.

London boroughs

Elections for all councillors in all thirty-two London boroughs were held in 2022 in line with their normal election schedule. All twenty-five London borough councils which have not had a boundary review since before 2013 were elected based on new boundaries. The previous elections to London borough councils were held in 2018, which saw Labour win its second-best result in any London election and the Conservatives return their lowest-ever number of councillors in the capital. In 2018, Labour won control of Tower Hamlets council which had previously been under no overall control, but did not gain control of Barnet, Wandsworth or Westminster councils, which the party had targeted. Meanwhile, the Liberal Democrats gained control of Kingston upon Thames and Richmond upon Thames borough councils from the Conservatives.

The 2022 elections saw Labour gain all three of Barnet, Wandsworth and Westminster councils which they had unsuccessfully targeted in 2018. The Conservatives gained control of Harrow from Labour as well as winning the new position of mayor of Croydon, with Croydon's council under no overall control, having previously been control by Labour. Lutfur Rahman gained the position of mayor of Tower Hamlets from Labour, with his Aspire party winning a majority of seats.

Metropolitan boroughs
There are thirty-six metropolitan boroughs, which are single-tier local authorities. Thirty-three of them elect a third of their councillors every year for three years, with no election in each fourth year. These councils hold their elections on the same timetable, which includes elections in 2022. Birmingham City Council holds its elections on a four-year cycle from 2018, so is also due to hold an election in 2022. Due to boundary changes, three councils which generally elect their councillors in thirds will elect all of their councillors in 2022. They will then return to the thirds schedule, apart from St Helens Council, which is moving to all-out elections every four years starting in 2022. Several other boundary reviews have been delayed to 2023 due to the COVID-19 pandemic. The scheduled elections in Liverpool in 2022 have been cancelled and instead the city is expected to move to all-out elections from 2023 on new ward boundaries.

Elections for all councillors

Election for one third of councillors 
By-elections or uncontested wards can cause the seats up for election to be above or below one third of the council.

District councils

Election of all councillors

Some councils which elect all their councillors every four years did so in 2022. Gosport usually elects its councillors in halves, but all seats will be up for election due to new election boundaries. St Albans usually elects by thirds but all seats were up on new boundaries. Harrogate was due to elect all its councillors, but the election was cancelled due to the unitarisation of North Yorkshire, with councillors' terms being extended to April 2023, after which the district councils in North Yorkshire will cease to exist.

Election of councillors by halves

District councils which elect their candidates in halves did so in 2022.

Election of councillors by thirds
District councils which elect by thirds that held elections in 2022. Carlisle, Craven and South Lakeland had been due to have a third of councillors up for election but these were cancelled due to the creation of Cumberland, North Yorkshire, and Westmorland and Furness Unitary authorities.

Unitary authorities

Election of all councillors

Reading Borough Council will have all its councillors elected on new ward boundaries. The new unitary authority Somerset Council will hold its first election under the old Somerset County Council boundaries, with twice as many councillors being elected as previously. Shadow authorities for the two new unitary authorities replacing Cumbria County Council and its districts will also be elected, as will councillors for the new North Yorkshire Council ahead of its creation in 2023.

Notably, the count for the Skipton West and West Craven seat ended in a tie between independent candidate Andy Solloway and the Labour candidate Peter Madeley. After various methods for deciding the tie were mooted, including drawing from a deck of cards, the candidates drew straws with Andy Solloway drawing the long straw, thus being declared the winner.

Election of councillors by thirds
Unitary authorities that elect councillors in thirds did so in 2022.

City of London Corporation

The Court of Common Council is the main decision-making body of the City of London Corporation, which governs the City of London. The 100 councillors were elected across twenty-five wards. Elections were due on 18 March 2021, but as a result of the coronavirus pandemic were delayed to 23 March 2022.

Mayors

There were six local authority mayoral elections and one metropolitan mayoral election.

Combined authorities

Local authorities

There was also a referendum in Bristol on whether to continue using the mayor-and-cabinet system or to change to the committee system, with 59% voting to abolish the position of mayor.

Scotland

By party

Councils

Elections were held for all councillors in all 32 local authorities in Scotland. Local elections in Scotland are conducted by the single transferable vote (STV), which results in the number of seats won by each party more proportionally reflecting their share of the vote. As a consequence, local elections in Scotland result more often in no overall control and local authorities being governed by minority or coalition administrations.
In this election two of the 32 councils came under one-party majorities - Dundee (SNP) and West Dunbartonshire (Labour).

Wales

Elections were held for all councillors in all 22 local authorities as well as for all community council seats in Wales. In all twenty-two councils, the elections were contested under new boundaries. This was the first time Welsh councils could choose between conducting the vote with the current first-past-the-post system or the proportional single transferable vote (STV) system, although practically this will not come into effect until at least 2027, as councils need to give advance notice of such a change.

By party

Councils

Opinion polling

England

Scotland

Northern Ireland

The 2022 election to the Northern Ireland Assembly took place on 5 May 2022.

The Northern Ireland local elections are due in 2023.

See also
 2022 Birmingham Erdington by-election
 2022 Tiverton and Honiton by-election
 2022 Wakefield by-election

Notes

References

 
2022 elections in the United Kingdom
2022 United Kingdom local elections